Châteaufarine is a newly developed area of Besançon located in the west of the city. It is a famous commercial center, the biggest of Franche-Comté, and a part of Planoise, France.

History 

In 1971, "Châteaufarine" was a name of a hamlet, located in the present area of Planoise. This toponym was the name of a farm built by a baker for his children. In 1990, construction began for the first commercial centre in the region.

See also 
 Planoise
 Besançon

Areas of Besançon
Planoise